Catephia cana is a species of moth of the family Erebidae. It is found in Iran.

References

Catephia
Moths described in 1939
Moths of Asia